Dumagat literally means "sea-faring" or "from the sea" in Philippine languages.

Dumagat may also refer to:

Ethnic groups
Dumagat people (also spelled Dumaget), a subgroup of Aeta people in Luzon, Philippines
Dumagat ("sea people"), an informal term for the coastal Visayan people in Mindanao to contrast them from inland Lumad people. the Agta in the provinces of Rizal, Bulacan, Nueva Ecija, Quezon, Aurora, Nueva Vizcaya, Isabela, Cagayan, Abra, Camarines Norte, and Camarines Sur have called themselves “Agta,” which means “human” in their native language (Ancestral Domain 2014, 3; Bennagen 1977, 35).

Languages
Umiray Dumaget language
Remontado Dumagat language
Casiguran Dumagat language

See also
Dinagat (disambiguation)

Language and nationality disambiguation pages